The Greater Baltimore Bus Initiative (GBBI) (pronounced GIBBY) was a sweeping overhaul planned by the Maryland Transit Administration under the administration of then-Maryland Governor Robert Ehrlich and his transportation secretary Robert Flanagan that was said to be the largest single-phase overhaul in the history of the agency and its parent companies.

According to Ehrlich and Flanagan, the initiative was a series of improvements to the transit system in the Baltimore area. While some of the proposed changes were obvious improvements, others were heavily opposed by riders, elected officials, and advocates, who considered them inconveniences and losses of service. As a result, a scaled-back version of the plan dubbed Phase I was implemented on its originally scheduled date, October 23, 2005, that included about one-third of the original plans and some modifications to those. Of those plans not implemented on this date, some were entirely scrapped, and others delayed.

During 2006, a second wave of changes dubbed Phase II was proposed and was modified during that year. Though Flanagan continued to state these were improvements, these plans continued to be viewed as controversial and resulted in legislative action to delay their implementation.

Following these political battles and the change of administration in the state of Maryland, the remainder of GBBI was officially canceled in on May 9, 2007, with no further routing changes being made under that name. But in September 2007, MTA announced that a series of hearings would be held the following month regarding a new wave of proposed changes. Though not titled "Greater Baltimore Bus Initiative" or anything similar, some of the planned changes did resemble those previously announced as part of GBBI. Most of these new routings were implemented on February 17, 2008.

Background
Announced in the Summer 2005, the GBBI plan involved routing and scheduling changes to all but six of the agency's then 59 local bus lines and some of its commuter services. These modifications included some expansions, increased frequency of service on some lines, consolidation of some lines, and elimination of others.

According to MTA, service would be improved in the following ways:

Frequency would be increased in many areas
Service would be simplified from a set of lines with many branches each to a set of routes with all trips following the identical route
There would be longer layovers, allowing for more recovery time and better reliability
Lines would be made more direct with fewer transfers being made necessary and fewer deviations off the main routes
Bus stops would be better placed to strike a balance between access and efficiency
Rapid west-east crosstown service would be provided on a new No. 40 Line that would operate from Security Square Mall to Essex Park-and-Ride
Some lines would be combined for single-seat service to a broader range of areas
Duplication of service by multiple bus lines would be reduced in order to use the savings generated to provide additional service on other lines
Improved bus service would be provided to landmarks where ridership was in greater demand, including colleges, universities, hospitals, and shopping malls.
Improved crosstown service would be provided, as most riders today are not trying to travel downtown, but rather other places in the city
Improved midday service would be provided, as midday ridership has steadily increased over the years

The plan did not meet well with riders, community activists, and elected officials. According to critics, the plan had the following problems:
Bus service would be eliminated on certain streets, requiring riders, including the elderly and disabled, to walk a few extra blocks to reach a bus line.
Certain lines and branches of some lines serving various employers were to be eliminated. MTA described these as underutilized branches.
Travel for some would be more complicated, requiring additional transfers. For those less able to adapt, travel would be even more troubling.
The plan was also criticized for being deceptive. While the advantages provided to riders were highlighted, the losses of service or reductions in frequency that resulted were mentioned little if at all.

A series of hearings were held during that summer pertaining to the changes. Many of the modifications were met with heavy criticism from the riders, the media, elected officials, and civic organizations, and as a result, many planned changes were either delayed or not implemented at all.

Phase I

On October 23, 2005, the original planned date with the changes to take effect, a scaled-back version of the plan, dubbed Phase I, was implemented. Service was added, eliminated, reduced, or modified on just 26 lines in the system, where MTA believed these changes would have only a minimal negative impact. Lines involved in these changes included nos. 2, 4, 8, 10, 13, 20, 23, 24, 31, 33, 35, 44, 65, 77, 86, 102, 103, 105, 150, 160, M-1, M-6, M-8, M-10, M-12, and M-17 (see "changes" below for more details).

Nevertheless, the changes were met by riders with disdain, and were protested by the NAACP and various unions. Many riders were still forced to walk farther, transfer, or wait longer for buses, and some riders were left without any service. Others complained that the new lines were less reliable. Critics complained that the GBBI changes made travel more difficult for many riders. Some of the complaints of riders that were reported in the Baltimore Sun were as follows:
Riders who at one time caught Route 10 buses along Wise Avenue for service straight into Baltimore City now had to catch a bus on Route 4, which only provided hourly service, and did not serve various communities deviating off of Wise Avenue.

The new Route 12, replacing service on a branch of Route 8, provided unreliable service to Stella Maris. Riders who at one time had single-seat service on the no. 8 line, had to transfer, and were missing their connections.
The modified Route 13 did not provide service along Washington Street, Wolfe Street, or Milton Avenue, requiring the elderly to walk up to six blocks.
Route 44 provided very inefficient service to the Social Security Administration once provided by Route M-6, causing employees of the Baltimore area's largest employer to be late. In addition, no off-peak service was provided to the Social Security campus.
The elimination of the Route M-6 required the elderly to walk at least several blocks to the nearest bus line.
Route M-10 provided replacement service for the eliminated Route M-12 to Villa Julie College, but not to the communities of Stevenson and Caves Roads.
Various lines had very poor schedule adherence. These included nos. 2/10, 8, 9, 20, and 23, and the new no. 40 line. In addition, many reported the no. 40 line had very low ridership. Additionally, studies showed the system had a very poor on-time performance.

Revisions to Phase I
Around New Year's Day 2006, MTA announced that there would be some revisions to the original changes proposed due to various issues. These included:
More peak hour service would be added to Route 9, which would be extended to International Circle.
Selected weekday trips on Route 10 (renamed from Route 2/10) and on Route 20 would makes short turns in the Dundalk area in order to improve schedule adherence.
Route 13 would return to its original route on Washington and Wolfe Streets on most trips, and a new branch would be added to serve Milton Street.
Route 40 would be extended to Middle River, and its frequency slightly reduced.

Activists were disappointed when no reversals were announced for Route M-6 at this time. However, a handful of Route M-6 trips were reintroduced in March, which was not enough to please activists.

Phase II
In 2006, a Phase II was proposed that was met with even more controversy. This phase was delayed several times for various reasons, and ultimately scrapped in 2007 following the election of Governor Martin O'Malley in favor of incremental changes.

In March of that year, MTA announced that there would be a Phase II of GBBI. In the announcement, it was declared that twenty-three local bus lines would undergo routing and/or scheduling changes, or else be consolidated with other lines, and these changes would take place on June 11, 2006. According to MTA literature produced at the time, these changes were all improvements that would, for the most part, have a positive impact on riders. Then Maryland transportation secretary Robert Flanagan said that only 46 riders would lose their daily bus service.

The plan was heavily criticized, not only because some riders would lose service or else find it more difficult, but because no hearings were being held to get input from riders. Flanagan said that hearings held during the previous year were sufficient, and that those who had concerns about these changes could write letters to MTA to express their views.

The plan was delayed when the 2006 General Assembly wrote language into their budget that stated that no improvements could be made on any MTA bus lines until MTA held a minimum of two hearings, besides several other stipulations.

As a result of the language found in the budget passed by the Maryland General Assembly, the June 11 improvements were delayed. In late June 2006, two hearings were held per requirement. At the hearings, riders mostly voiced concerns pertaining to the negative impact felt by the October 2005 changes, as well as minor details of the planned ones.

A second version of phase II was proposed later in 2006, in which some of the original Phase II proposals were modified based on earlier complaints, but it never took effect, with the exception of additional service being added on five bus lines in October of that year. On October 8, 2006, part of Phase II was implemented. All other plans were scheduled to be implemented on February 11, 2007. However, as Martin O'Malley replaced Robert Ehrlich as Maryland governor, and much of the administration saw changes, MTA has delayed further implementing any part of GBBI in order to give the O'Malley administration a chance to place their stamp of approval upon the changes, but the administration announced it was scrapping the plan on May 9, 2007 in favor of incremental changes three times a year. The first set of changes, which affected 19 bus lines, and were mostly very minor, took place on June 10, 2007.

February 2008 plans
In September 2007, MTA announced a set of hearings that would be held the following month regarding a series of changes to ten lines. This was not considered to be a part of the already canceled GBBI, though some of the changes that were proposed resembled those under GBBI. Most notably, plans included:
Rerouting Route 11 to Canton and extending Route 36 to replace the southern portion
Eliminating Route 61 and providing the service on 11
Realigning Routes 3, 11, and 55 in the Towson area
Realigning Routes 27 and 98 in the Hampden area
Changes the route of Route 16 and doubling its peak hour frequency

Additionally, several other changes never included in GBBI were proposed:
Introducing a new Route 6 that would supplement peak hour service on parts of Routes 5 and 20, which would not be changed
Modifying Routes 36 (replacing Route 11) and 77 in the Arbutus area to serve a new Wal-Mart Supercenter.
Splitting Route M-9 into two separate routes, identified as Routes 56 and 59

On February 17, 2008, all these changes were implemented, except Route 61 service continued to operate during peak hours only.

Changes

External links 
 MTA's Homepage
 GBBI brochure published by MTA

References 

Maryland Transit Administration